John Wilkins (1614–1672) was an English clergyman, natural philosopher, author, founder of the Royal Society, and Bishop of Chester.

John Wilkins may also refer to:
John Wilkins (basketball) (born 1989), Moroccan basketball player
John Wilkins (Indian artist) (1927–1991)
John Wilkins (American football coach)
John Wilkins Jr. (1761–1816), 7th Quartermaster General of the United States Army
John Wilkins (Salem witch trials) (1642–1723), accuser in the Salem witch trials
John T. Wilkins III (1880–1929), American politician in the Virginia House of Delegates
J. Ernest Wilkins Sr. (1894–1959), African-American lawyer, labor leader and undersecretary
Reverend John Wilkins, son of Robert Wilkins
John Wilkins (officer), a commandant of the Illinois Country

See also
Jack Wilkins (born 1944), American jazz guitarist
John Wilkins Whitfield (1818–1879), territorial delegate to the United States Congress representing the Kansas Territory
John Wilkin (fl. 1990s–2010s), American librarian